The following tables show results for the Australian House of Representatives at the 1993 federal election held on 13 March 1993.

Australia

States

New South Wales

Victoria

Queensland

Western Australia

South Australia

Tasmania

|abc

Territories

Australian Capital Territory

Northern Territory

See also
 Results of the 1993 Australian federal election (Senate)
 Members of the Australian House of Representatives, 1993–1996

Notes

References

House of Representatives 1993
Australian House of Representatives
1993 elections in Australia